US Foods (formerly known as U.S. Foodservice) is an American foodservice distributor. With approximately $24 billion in annual revenue, US Foods was the 10th largest private company in America until its IPO. It was founded in August 1989. Many of the entities that make up US Foods were founded in the 19th century, including one that sold provisions to travelers heading west during the 1850s gold rush. US Foods offers more than 350,000 national brand products and its own "exclusive brand" items, ranging from fresh meats and produce to prepackaged and frozen foods. The company employs approximately 25,200 people in more than 60 locations nationwide and provides food and related products to more than 250,000 customers, including independent and multi-unit restaurants, healthcare and hospitality entities, government and educational institutions. The company is headquartered in Rosemont, Illinois, and is a publicly held company trading under the ticker symbol USFD on the New York Stock Exchange.

On 9 December 2013, Sysco Corp announced it would acquire US Foods for $8.2 billion ($3.5 billion plus $4.7 billion of debt), but on June 24, 2015, U.S. federal judge Amit Mehta ruled that the combined Sysco-US Foods would control 75% of the U.S. foodservice industry and that would stifle competition. On June 29, 2015, Sysco terminated its merger with US Foods.

History

Early history
Several of the entities that comprised what is now US Foods started in the 19th century. Monarch Foods, for example, traced its roots to Reid-Murdoch Co., a Dubuque, Iowa, company founded in 1853 to provision wagon trains heading west. Reid-Murdoch was a major sponsor of The Teenie Weenies comic strip.

John Sexton & Company began as a retail tea and coffee merchant in Chicago, Illinois, in 1883. John Sexton soon discovered hotels and restaurants were his biggest customers. By 1887, Sexton closed his four Chicago retail locations to focus on his institutional customers. By 1891, Sexton began manufacturing private label pickles, salad dressings, preserves, and jellies as well as roasting coffee in downtown Chicago. In addition, Sexton established a food testing laboratory to guarantee that his products had a uniform high level of quality. He also developed an extensive national institutional sales force in all major metropolitan areas, and a catalog mail order grocery business. All national orders were shipped via rail or parcel post from Sexton's Chicago warehouse. Chicago deliveries were by Sexton horse and wagon fleet, and after 1924, Sexton electric and diesel truck fleets. By 1930, Sexton dropped the catalog mail order business and concentrated on the institutional customers throughout the United States. In 1933, Sexton opened a warehouse and truck fleet in Brooklyn, New York, to support the New York Sexton sales force. By 1949, John Sexton & Co. was operating branch warehouses and truck fleets in Atlanta, Chicago, Dallas, Detroit, Long Island City, Philadelphia and Pittsburgh to support the Sexton national salesforce. In 1962, John Sexton & Co. was listed as a public company on the Over the Counter Stock Market with $79 million in sales and $2 million in profits. In 1968, John Sexton & Co. had $90 million in sales, which represented 5% of the total institutional foodservice industry. In 1968, Sexton warehouses and truck fleets were located in Atlanta, Boston, Chicago, Cincinnati, Dallas, Detroit, Los Angeles, New York, Orlando, Philadelphia, St. Louis and San Francisco with a regional salesforce covering the majority of the United States. This gave Sexton a coast to coast distribution and sales network to service their 79,000 customers. In late 1968, John Sexton & Co. was purchased by Beatrice Foods for $37.5 million in Beatrice preferred shares and assumption of Sexton debt.<ref>[https://books.google.com/books?id=KKGoHlXgoaYC&dq=%22john+sexton%22+beatrice&pg=PP1 "Beatrice: From Buildup to Breakup, Gazel, Neil (1990)]</ref> Beatrice Foods operated Sexton as an independent division until 1983, when Beatrice sold Sexton to S.E. Rykoff & Co of Los Angeles, CA for $84.5 million." Rykoff-Sexton Match Pays Off But L.A. Firm's Smaller Acquisitions Less Successful", The Los Angeles Times, December 23, 1985.  Retrieved 24 June 2010.

L. H. Parke Company started in 1889 as a partnership of Louis H. Parke and William P. M. Irwin. The partnership took over the small provision-pushcart business of Samuel Irwin, a civil war vet. who had lost his arm in the Battle of Winchester, Virginia. Parke started as a seller of coffee, tea and spices. The company grew to be a major institutional wholesale seller of canned goods and had five locations (Philadelphia, Pittsburgh, Washington, DC, Albany, New York and Richmond, VA) by the time it sold out to Consolidated Foods in 1962. Donald Irwin Jr., President of Parke, became the first president of Monarch Institutional Foods at that time.

Los Angeles-based S.E. Rykoff & Co. was established in 1911, and the Mazo and Lerch families started their business in Northern Virginia in 1927. Most of these wholesalers tended to specialize, selling items to local grocery stores. In the early 1930s, distributors, including Mazo-Lerch Company, began offering frozen foods, primarily frozen french fries and orange juice.

Post-World War II
Foodservice distributors served institutional clients that provided food away from home, unlike retail distributors, who sold to grocery stores. The first distinction between the two groups came about in 1951, with the formation of the Association of Institutional Distributors. With fighting going on in Korea, the federal government reinstituted price controls, including a 16 percent ceiling on food distributors' gross profits. About a dozen companies met in Chicago to respond to that action. Because it cost more to distribute to their institutional customers than to grocery stores, the distributors wanted to be considered separately from grocery wholesalers and to have their ceiling raised to at least 21 percent. They were successful in their lobbying efforts.

The federal government also helped open up foodservice markets. Five years earlier, in 1946, the U.S. Congress passed the National School Lunch Act. Suddenly, large numbers of schoolchildren were eating cooked meals away from home, and school cafeterias became the first institutional mass market. One of the few distributors to focus on schools was the Pearce-Young-Angel Company (PYA) in the Carolinas. That same year, Consolidated Foods Corp., the precursor of Sara Lee Corporation, acquired Monarch Foods.

By the late 1950s, most distributors had added frozen foods to their product lines. In 1958, Mazo-Lerch held the first food show, and was one of the first distributors to offer both custom-cut meats and beverage dispenser programs. The diversification trend continued over the years, as foodservice distributors provided disposable items such as paper napkins and tablecloths, followed by china and glassware, then light and heavy equipment.

The 1960s
In 1965, Americans spent just 20 cents of every food dollar for food away from home. Total distributor sales that year were an estimated $9 billion, and the average institutional distributor had an annual volume of $1.5-$2 billion. Institutional Distributor, in its first survey of the foodservice distribution industry, found that the average order size of respondents was $80.40, and the average number of customers was 572. The survey also found that nearly half of the respondents sold to both grocery and institutional customers. In 1962, John Sexton & Company went public and its shares traded on the Over the Counter Stock Market (NASDAQ) with $79 million in sales and $2 million in profits.

The 1970s
The decade of the 1970s saw the move to broadline, multi-branch organizations. Consolidated Foods bought the old Pearce-Young-Angel distribution network in 1971 and merged it with its Monarch Foods subsidiary to form PYA/Monarch. Sysco was established in 1970 by combining five independent wholesale grocery companies. Sysco went public in 1970 with $115 million in annual sales and shares were traded on the NYSE. Continental Coffee Company established in 1915 by the Cohn family (CFS Continental) went public in 1970. S.E. Rykoff & Co. was generating $1.9 million in profits with revenue of $75.9 million and went public in 1972. In 1973, Continental Coffee Company changed their name to CFS Continental, Inc. to reflect the growing importance of foodservice to their traditional coffee business. By the end of 1979, Sysco of Houston, TX has sales of $895 million. CFS Continental of Chicago, IL had sales of $775 million. PYA/Monarch of Greenville, SC had sales of $614 million, John Sexton & Company of Chicago, IL had sales of $350 million. S.E. Rykoff & Co. of Los Angeles, CA was generating $320 million strictly on the west coast.

The 1980s
The distribution industry went through a difficult period during the early 1980s, with companies under pressure as a result of inflation and economic slowdown. However, people still needed to eat, and much of the pressure was from competition. Speakers at national conferences focused on customer service, productivity, and professional development. Computers were playing a greater role in the business, enabling a distributor to provide customers with information to help control inventory, determine menu costs, and analyze profitability. As distributors became more professional, restaurant chains such as Marriott and Howard Johnson folded or reduced their self-distribution activities and focused on their restaurant operations.

By 1982, institutional foodservice distribution was a $69 billion industry. The five companies considered "national distributors" were PYA/Monarch, John Sexton & Company (a division of Beatrice Foods with $360 million in sales), Sysco Corporation of Houston ($1 billion in sales), CFS Continental, Inc. ($1 billion in sales), and Kraft Foodservice. The five companies had a total of 168 distribution centers covering major portions of the country. Despite the geographical dominance, these five multi-branch distributors reported combined sales in 1982 of $4.8 billion – 7 percent of the total foodservice industry.

Over the next several years, the big distributors made major acquisitions. S.E. Rykoff & Co. bought John Sexton & Company in 1983 for $84.5 million from Beatrice Foods, in what was then the largest acquisition in the industry. The renamed Rykoff-Sexton took fourth place among foodservice distributors with $800 million in sales. CFS Continental, Inc. purchase of Publix Fruit and Produce moved it into third place, with sales in the $1.1 billion range. Number one Sysco acquired B.A. Railton along with Pegler, increasing its volume to over $2 billion. Meanwhile, in Greenville, South Carolina, number two PYA/Monarch bought Fleming Foodservice of Austin, Texas, raising its 1984 sales volume to an estimated $1.3 billion. By the end of its fiscal year in June 1984, PYA/Monarch was serving some 70,000 foodservice operators, and its 22 distribution centers blanketed 60 percent of the United States.

PYA/Monarch was one of the first distributors to compete as a provider of services as well as products. "The day of the distributor who merely warehouses, delivers, and takes orders for products a customer wants is over," company management told Institutional Distribution in a 1984 article. PYA/Monarch's mission statement revealed its goal: "...to be a premier company in every area of operations, providing products and services that can enable a customer to run a more efficient and profitable business."

Using the largest computer in the industry, PYA/Monarch phased in a new state-of-the-art data processing system. Totally centralized, the system made it possible for headquarters to carry out data processing for each of the 22 branches, whose computers now gathered data.

The 1980s saw a tremendous change in the eating habits in the United States. By 1986, Americans were spending one-third of every food dollar outside the supermarket, and the foodservice distribution had grown to a $78 billion industry.

By April 1989, Sara Lee Corporation had decided to sell off the northern division of PYA/Monarch, citing dissatisfaction with its performance. Although the southeast division was the top food distributor in its region, overall PYA/Monarch ranked third behind Sysco and Kraft, and Sara Lee was committed to being first or second in each of its businesses.

In June 1989, members of PYA/Monarch management incorporated a new entity, JPF Holdings, Inc. Two weeks later, on July 3, JPF Holdings acquired all the capital stock of the Sara Lee subsidiary, JP Foodservice Distributors, Inc., including the mid-Atlantic and northeastern operations of PYA/Monarch Inc. Under the terms of the leveraged buyout, Sara Lee retained ownership of PYA/Monarch, now operating in the southeast, as well as 47 percent of the shares in JP Foodservice.

Headed by James L. Miller, who had been executive vice-president of PYA/Monarch's northern division, the new company immediately sold three of its branches – Los Angeles, Little Rock, and Paducah – to Kraft Foodservice. The result was a major regional operation with nine distribution centers serving a territory from Virginia north to Maine and west to Nebraska.

JP Foodservice Distributors passed the $1 billion mark in its first year, with sales for fiscal 1990 of $1.02 billion. That was a jump of more than 12 percent from the division's sales in fiscal 1989, and made the new company number five among the top 50 distributors selected by Institutional Distributor. But Miller and the other managers had borrowed over 95 percent of the $317 million they paid for the company. With that amount of debt, and with a soft economy, JP concentrated on building the lowest cost structure in the industry. The company invested primarily in improving facilities, adding a new $15 million replacement center between Washington, D.C., and Baltimore and building an addition at its Allentown, Pennsylvania, warehouse that doubled freezer and cooler capacity. It also used technology to cut costs and provide greater service to its customers. For example, a hand-held electronic device allowed JP customers to monitor their inventory and send information to the company.

The 1990s
In November 1994, five years after it was created, the company adopted the name JP Foodservice, Inc. and went public in November, listed on the NASDAQ under the symbol JPFS. Sara Lee Corporation now held 37 percent of JP common stock. The public offering raised $86 million, and JP restructured and paid off much of its debt.

JP Foodservice had more than 21,000 customers in 25 states in the Mid-Atlantic, Midwest, and Northeast regions of the country and was the sixth largest food distributor. It provided customers with a broad line of products, including canned, dry, frozen, and fresh foods, paper products, detergents, and light restaurant equipment. With its debt problems resolved, the company set a new growth strategy which, in addition to increasing internal growth, included acquiring smaller distributors. Its first purchases were Tri River Foods, Inc. and Rotelle Inc., two Pennsylvania distributors. JP's strategy also called for increasing its line of private label products, which included Hilltop Hearth breads, Cattlemen's Choice meats, and Roseli Italian foods.

Foodservice distribution had grown to become a $124 billion industry, and the ten largest distributors accounted for 18 percent of the business. JP's business, which for fiscal 1995 reached $1.12 billion, was about 55 percent independent (hospital cafeterias, family-owned restaurants) and 45 percent chains. The increasing product demands and bigger menus of the chains and large restaurants were important factors fueling consolidation among distributors.

Toward the end of 1995, the company and its former parent, Sara Lee Corporation, began talks about exchanging PYA/Monarch, Sara Lee's southeastern foodservice subsidiary, for JP stock worth about $946 million. Yet, the two companies failed to reach agreement on several factors, including valuation (JP's stock price had gone up in expectation of the merger), structure, and dilution of earnings to existing shareholders, and the deal fell through in February 1996. The experience left both sides bitter, and JP was expected to find a way to reduce Sara Lee's presence or end its investment in the company all together.

That separation occurred before the end of 1996, when JP held a public offering involving the sale of all the common stock held by Sara Lee. On December 31, 1996, JP Foodservice moved to the New York Stock Exchange, trading under the symbol JPF.

JP continued buying smaller companies, paying for them with $66 million raised by another stock offering. Acquisitions included Valley Industries of Las Vegas, Arrow Paper and Supply Company, based in Connecticut, Squeri Food Service of Cincinnati, and Mazo-Lerch Company, Inc., the 70-year-old food distributor based in northern Virginia that had held the first food fair in 1953. By the end of the fiscal year in June, net sales were up 17 percent to $1.7 billion, with acquisitions accounting for about six percent of the increase and the remaining 11 percent from internal growth. JP's growth was significantly higher than the three percent for the foodservice distribution industry. The JP Foodservice company credited its internal growth to sales training and promotions and to the expansion of its private and signature brands.

U.S. Foodservice
The name U.S. Foodservice" comes from United Signature Foods, Inc., a broad-line distributor based in Wilkes-Barre, Pennsylvania. U.S. Foodservice, Inc., was formed in March 1992 by Unifax, Inc., specifically to acquire the White Swan, Inc., a Dallas-based distributor. The merger with White Swan was completed in October 1993. Through a share exchange (shares of White Swan were swapped for shares of U.S. Foodservice), it created one of the largest broad-line distributors in the country.

The resulting combined entity had five operating subsidiaries: White Swan, Bevaco Food Service, Kings Foodservice, Inc., Roanoke Restaurant Service, and Biggers Brothers, Inc., thus operating food-service distribution centers in Pennsylvania, North Carolina, Tennessee, Virginia, Texas, Ohio, West Virginia, Oklahoma and Florida. Merrill Lynch Capital Partners, a wholly owned subsidiary of Merrill Lynch & Co., owned a controlling ownership in both White Swan and U.S. Foodservice, by virtue of its funding each company's leveraged buyouts—White Swan in 1988 and Unifax in 1992. The U.S. Foodservice management team was to include Frank Bevevino, president and chief executive; Thomas G. McMullen and Peter Smith, vice presidents; David F. McAnally, vice president and chief financial officer; and William Griffin, vice president of administration.

In 1995 U.S. Foodservice of Wilkes Barre, Pennsylvania, was the fourth largest broad-line food-service distributor, according to Institutional Distributor Magazine'', behind Sysco (No. 1), Rykoff-Sexton (No. 2), and Kraft Foodservice (No. 3), and just ahead of JP Foodservice (No. 5) and PYA/Monarch (No. 6).

Within the next 12 to 24 months, S.E. Rykoff/John Sexton would acquire Continental Foods of Baltimore, Maryland, H&O Foods of Las Vegas, Nevada, and U.S. Foodservice. Rykoff-Sexton management created the Rykoff-Sexton Funding Corporation to finance the acquisition of its close competitor U.S. Foodservice, and by the end of 1996 the newly renamed and much larger corporation was now trading on the New York Exchange as Rykoff-Sexton, Inc.

After the acquisition, U.S. Foodservice was operated as a division of Rykoff-Sexton. The parent company also operated a private-label manufacturing division (historical food-service brands like John Sexton and SERCO), a food-service contract-and-design division (historically known as Finegolds), and food-service equipment and supply (second in size at the time to only Edward Don & Co.).

Rykoff-Sexton management was not done yet; negotiations were already under way in 1997 to combine with JP Foodservice. Mark Van Stekelenburg, then chairman of the board and chief executive officer of Rykoff-Sexton, and the former president and chief executive officer of G.V.A., Inc., the largest food service distributor in the Netherlands and a subsidiary of Royal Ahold, N.V., had led Rykoff-Sexton into the combination of the industry's second-, fourth-, and fifth-largest corporations in less than 24 months. In early 1997 Stekelenburg predicted that "Rykoff-Sexton Inc./U.S. Foodservice will be the number 1, number 2, or number 3 player in every market in which it serves the broad-line food-service distribution business."

The merger between Rykoff-Sexton (with just under $5 billion in yearly revenue) and JP Foodservice (with $1.7 billion in revenue) was consummated later in 1997. The compbined company jumped to second place among food-service distributors. This was much bigger than any of JP Foodservice's previous acquisitions or mergers. Sales were expected to triple, to $6 billion, and the number of JP Foodservice customers ballooned to 130,000. As a result, Standard & Poor's added JPF to the S&P MidCap 400 Index. The merger also changed JP Foodservice from a major distributor in the East and Midwest into one operating coast to coast. New territories included the Southeast, the Sun Belt, and the West Coast.

The reemergence of U.S. Foodservice
In early 1998, Mark Van Stekelenburg, now president of JP Foodservice and vice-chairman of its board of directors, handed over the reins of the corporation to Jim Miller and returned to Royal Ahold. Shortly after the Stekelenburg's departure, JP Foodservice changed its name to U.S. Foodservice, the name of the company it had acquired. As a result, the company's trading symbol on the New York Stock Exchange was changed from JPF to USFD on Monday, March 2, 1998.

Acquisitions continued even as the new U.S. Foodservice worked to assimilate the Rykoff-Sexton operations, adding Sorrento Food Service, Inc., of Buffalo, Westlund, a Minnesota custom cut meat specialist and a number of other smaller food-service companies.

By mid-1998, Chairman and CEO Jim Miller was proud of the accomplishments, telling the Baltimore Sun, "We not only successfully completed the largest merger ever in our industry, tripling the size of our company, we did so achieving record earnings and meeting or exceeding virtually every goal set out in our merger plan." In the 3rd quarter of the calendar year 1998, U.S. Foodservice announced it was selling the assets of its Rykoff-Sexton manufacturing division as part of its plan to shed its non-core operations.

By fiscal 2000 U.S. Foodservice was generating sales greater than $7 billion.

In the first quarter of calendar year 2000 Royal Ahold filed a tender offer through its subsidiaries Ahold Acquisition, Inc., and Koninklijke Ahold, N.V., with the U.S. Securities and Exchange Commission, to buy all outstanding shares of U.S. Foodservice.

The 2000s
March 20, 2000, U.S. Foodservice agreed to be acquired by Dutch multinational Royal Ahold for $26 per share or $3.6 billion.

To strengthen its presence in the southeastern United States, U.S. Foodservice acquired former sister company PYA/Monarch for $1.57 billion on December 5, 2000. The acquisition meant U.S. Foodservice's sales would now reach $12 billion annually.

In November 2001, the U.S. Foodservice division of Ahold, acquired Alliant Exchange, Inc., parent company of Alliant Foodservice. This greatly expanded the geographical range of its activities. In fact, U.S. Foodservice said Alliant would give it access to 21 new U.S. markets. This $2.2 billion purchase gives U.S. Foodservice distribution centers and food processing facilities in areas that are serving 100,000 customers—including independent and multiunit restaurant operations, hotels, contract foodservice operations and healthcare facilities. In 2000, Alliant Foodservice reported revenues of $6.6 billion. (Kraft Foodservice became Alliant Foodservice in 1996 after Clayton, Dubilier & Rice, Inc. purchased the Kraft Foodservice division from the Philip Morris Corporation).

After the Alliant acquisition, U.S. Foodservice was now generating combined total revenues of approaching $14 billion. U.S. Foodservice growth was 600% over the last 6 years, from about $2 billion in revenues in 1995, to $14 billion in late 2001.

The making of U.S. Foodservice reflects the trends of its industry: from retail to institutional customers; from specific products to a broadline of offerings; from single distribution centers to multi-unit branches; increased professionalism and customer service; and, most pronounced, the continuing and aggressive expansion through acquisition.

U.S. Foodservice taken private by investment funds
During 2006 there was much speculation as to which equity firm would acquire U.S. Foodservice from Royal Ahold. Ahold had refused to consider a spinoff of the subsidiary to the capital markets, and appeared to be headed toward an auction that JP Morgan would manage.

This was consistent with many larger going concerns in the United States that appeared to be headed away from being publicly traded in what many believed was an attempt to avoid the requirements of the Sarbanes-Oxley Act of 2002. After the internal accounting controls and procedures struggles that U.S. Foodservice had gone through over the past 3 years—the very same that the Sarbanes-Oxley Act of 2002 was designed to address—one had to wonder if U.S. Foodservice being privately held was the proper path toward a transparent valuation of the company.

On May 2, 2007, Clayton, Dubilier & Rice, Inc. (CD&R) and Kohlberg Kravis Roberts & Co. L.P. (KKR) announced a definitive agreement to acquire U.S. Foodservice from Royal Ahold. Funds affiliated with CD&R and KKR are equal partners in the transaction, valued at $7.1 billion. The Washington Post quoted Robert S. Goldin, an executive vice president at Technomic, a food consulting firm in Chicago, as saying, "When Ahold acquired U.S. Foodservice, the industry consensus was that it overpaid." Industry analysts had previously estimated U.S. Foodservice could be worth $5.1 billion to $5.7 billion, the Post reported, adding that industry experts now agreed that Ahold got top dollar.

"For Ahold this is a reasonably good end to what's been a pretty unsuccessful foray into U.S. food distribution," Goldin continued. "It's been a sore spot for them. They overpaid for the business and never rationalized it. I would imagine they are pretty happy to put this one behind them."

The Post added that "Ahold was forced to restate more than $800 million in earnings after it came to light that U.S. Foodservice executives had inflated promotional rebates from suppliers to meet earnings targets. The scandal caused the parent company's shares to plunge."

"Ahold settled with the Securities and Exchange Commission two years ago and agreed to pay $1.1 billion to resolve shareholder lawsuits."

The 2010s
On August 13, 2010, U.S. Foodservice announced that John A. Lederer was appointed president and chief executive officer effective September 8, 2010.

Acquisitions
Under Lederer, the company made several acquisitions in 2010 and 2011 including Nino's Wholesale, Midway Produce, WVO Industries, Ritter Food Service, Cerniglia Products, Great Western Meats, Inc., and Vesuvio Foods. US Foods also acquired the local restaurant distribution business of White Apron.

In 2012, US Foods acquired New City Packing Co., Bears Distribution, and Hawkeye Foodservice Distribution. 

In 2013, Quandt's Foodservice Distributors.

In 2015, Dierks Waukesha.

In 2016, Save On Seafood, Jeraci Foods, Freshway Foods, Cara Donna Provision Co.

In 2017, Toba Inc. Distribution Companies, F. Christiana, FirstClass Foods, SRA Foods and All American Foods.

In 2019, US Foods acquired SGA Food Group for $1.8 billion and in March 2020 entered into a deal to acquire Smart Foodservice Warehouse Stores for $970 million.

U.S. Foodservice becomes US Foods 

In September 26, 2011, U.S. Foodservice announced its name change to US Foods, Inc. (styled as "US. Foods" in the new logo unveiled at the same time).

Speciality divisions and companies

North Star Foodservice
As part of its rebranding in October 2011, the company changed the name of its North Star Foodservice divisions to US Foods.

Next Day Gourmet
As part of the company's rebranding effort in October 2011, US Foods changed the name of its equipment and supply division from Next Day Gourmet to US Foods Culinary Equipment & Supplies.

Stock Yards
In February 2000, Stock Yards Packing was sold to U.S. Foodservice. U.S. Foodservice owned seven other custom meat cutters at the time and wanted to add a company with a solid reputation to its mix. Other pluses in acquiring Stock Yards were that company's strong management and labor force, their excellent customer service; reputation for high-quality products, and the fact that Stock Yards was a certified Angus beef distributor. Dan Pollack stated at the time of the acquisition that he hoped to use Stock Yards' expertise to streamline and standardize the meat cutting operations of US Foods.

References

External links

Catering and food service companies of the United States
Companies based in Cook County, Illinois
Companies listed on the New York Stock Exchange
Private equity portfolio companies
Kohlberg Kravis Roberts companies
1994 initial public offerings
2016 initial public offerings
Rosemont, Illinois